The Men's team at the 2004 Summer Olympics as part of the archery programme were held at the Panathinaiko Stadium.

The men's team competition was the last archery event to be held, on 21 August.  The Korean team, after having been kept from winning any individual medals, won by successively larger margins as the rounds went by.

Ranking round
The team ranking round consisted merely of summing the scores of the team's three competitors from the individual ranking round.

Competition bracket 
The United States and the Netherlands both pulled off minor upsets in the first round of competition, the round of 16. The Korean, Italian, and Taiwanese teams sat out due to their high rankings.

Korea's margin of victory in the semifinals was somewhat larger than in the quarterfinals, though this was more due to a weaker performance by their opponent than anything else as Korea shot 8 points fewer than they had in the previous round.  Chinese Taipei narrowly defeated the United States to avoid the upset.

Both teams in the bronze medal final shot their lowest score of the competition.  The United States, who had outscored Ukraine in each of the previous rounds, was unable to do so in direct competition with the Ukrainians and fell to fourth place while the Ukrainians collected their first archery medal of the year.

The final turned out to be the easiest victory for the Korean team in the entire tournament, a 6-point win over Chinese Taipei.

Bronze Medal Match:  def.  237-235

References

Men's team
Olympics
Men's events at the 2004 Summer Olympics